Elie Stephan (alternatively Elie Estephan; born July 20, 1986 in Ghosta, Lebanon) is a professional Lebanese basketball player who is currently a member of Lebanese Basketball League team Byblos Club. He is also a member of Lebanon national basketball team as a Shooting Guard. He's 1.91 m tall (6 ft 3 in).

External links
Profile at asia-basket.com
Profile at FIBA.com
Player Elie Stephan

Living people
Lebanese men's basketball players
Shooting guards
1981 births
2010 FIBA World Championship players